

MACS0647-JD is a galaxy with a redshift of about z = 10.7, equivalent to a light travel distance of 13.26 billion light-years (4 billion parsecs). If the distance estimate is correct, it formed about 427 million years after the Big Bang.

Details
JD refers to J-band Dropout – the galaxy was not detected in the so-called J-band (F125W), nor in 14 bluer Hubble filters. It only appeared in the two reddest filters (F140W and F160W).

It is less than 600 light-years wide, and contains roughly a billion stars.

The galaxy was discovered with the help of Cluster Lensing And Supernova survey with Hubble (CLASH), which uses massive galaxy clusters as cosmic telescopes to magnify distant galaxies behind them, an effect called gravitational lensing. Observations were recorded by the Wide Field Camera 3 on the Hubble Space Telescope, with support from Spitzer Space Telescope.

The location of the galaxy is in the constellation Camelopardalis, which is also the location of the gravitational lensing cluster that helped discover this galaxy: MACSJ0647+7015 at z = 0.591.

MACS0647-JD was announced in November 2012, but by the next month UDFj-39546284, which was previously thought to be z = 10.3, was said to be at z = 11.9, although more recent analyses have suggested the latter is likely to be at a lower redshift.

Additional spectroscopic observations by JWST will be needed to accurately confirm the redshift of MACS0647-JD.

See also 
 List of the most distant astronomical objects
 Farthest galaxies

References

External links
 
 NASA Great Observatories Find Candidate for Most Distant Object in the Universe to Date
 European Space Agency – Galaxy cluster MACS J0647.7+7015

Galaxies
Camelopardalis (constellation)
Dwarf galaxies